An Air Force Instruction (AFI) is a documented instruction for members of the United States Air Force intended for use by active duty, guard, and reserve members and associated civilians.  It is one of many forms of directives published by the Air Force Departmental Publishing Office (AFDPO).  In almost all cases, an Air Force Instruction is a form of a general order; and violation of the AFI by an Airman subject to it can be punished under the UCMJ Uniform Code of Military Justice.

Examples

Some examples of an Air Force Instruction are:
 AFI 11-202V3 General Flight Rules prescribes general flight rules for all USAF aircraft; 
 AFI 36-2903 Dress and Appearance of Air Force Personnel outlines Air Force uniform wear and grooming standards; 
 AFI 36-2618 Enlisted Force Structure explains each enlisted rank in the U.S. Air Force, and the expectations and responsibilities for each; and 
 AFI 36-2905 Fitness Program explains the Air Force Fitness program and describes how it is to be implemented.

Air Force members are required to know, understand, and implement AFIs which apply to their duties and responsibilities.

References

United States Air Force